More Smiles is an album by the Kenny Clarke/Francy Boland Big Band featuring performances recorded in Germany in 1969 and released on the MPS label.

Reception

AllMusic awarded the album 3 stars.

Track listing
 "Johnny One Note" (Richard Rodgers, Lorenz Hart) - 2:38 	
 "Lullaby of the Leaves" (Bernice Petkere) - 4:14
 "Bei Dir War Es Immer So Schön" (Theo Mackeben) - 4:19 	
 "My Favorite Things" (Richard Rodgers, Oscar Hammerstein II) - 4:52 	
 "Just in Time" (Jule Styne, Betty Comden, Adolph Green) - 4:24 	
 "All Through the Night" (Cole Porter) - 3:01 	
 "November Girl" (Francy Boland) - 5:51 
 "My Heart Belongs to Daddy" (Cole Porter) - 2:39 
 "Love for Sale" (Cole Porter) - 2:37

Personnel 
Kenny Clarke - drums
Francy Boland - piano, arranger
Benny Bailey, Tony Fisher, Duško Gojković, Idrees Sulieman - trumpet
Nat Peck, Åke Persson, Eric van Lier - trombone
Derek Humble - alto saxophone 
Johnny Griffin, Ronnie Scott, Tony Coe - tenor saxophone
Sahib Shihab - baritone saxophone
Jimmy Woode - bass

References 

1969 albums
Kenny Clarke/Francy Boland Big Band albums
MPS Records albums